Rai Scuola (English: Rai School) is an Italian free-to-air television channel owned by Rai Cultura, an arm of State-owned broadcaster RAI. Launched in 1999 as Rai Edu Lab, the channel adopted its current name in 2009.

Programming
The channel broadcasts documentary, cultural and educational programming in 2 languages, the Italian and the English language.

Logos and identities

See also 
RAI
Rai Storia
Rai Nettuno Sat 1

References

External links
 Official Site 

Free-to-air
Scuola
Television channels and stations established in 2009
Commercial-free television networks
Italian-language television stations
Educational and instructional television channels
Documentary television channels